Koulé is a town and sub-prefecture in the Nzérékoré Prefecture in the Nzérékoré Region of Guinea.

The name Koulé come from the Kpelle "koule-be", which means "stay here".

Transport 

It lies near or on the route of the proposed standard gauge Transguinean Railways.

See also 

 Railway stations in Guinea
 Transport in Guinea

References 

Sub-prefectures of the Nzérékoré Region